Kurabayashi is a Japanese surname. Notable people with the name include:

Akiko Kurabayashi (born 1960), Japanese Communist politician
Takuto Kurabayashi (born 1992), Japanese cyclist

See also
Kuribayashi

Japanese-language surnames